Thomas Andrew Barman (born 1 January 1972), is a Belgian musician and film director.

Barman studied at the film school of St.-Lucas in Brussels, but did not finish his studies because he wished to pursue a career in music.

In 1989, he began by forming the rock band, dEUS, in Antwerp. Although he had chosen music over his interest in film, his experience aided him in directing his own music videos for dEUS, and he made a short film in 1996 titled Turnpike. He also directed videos for other Belgian musicians including Axelle Red and Hooverphonic among others.

He is of Norwegian descent from his father's side.

In the summer of 2002 shooting started in Antwerp for his first feature film Any Way the Wind Blows which was released in Belgian cinemas in the summer of 2003. Live, an album in collaboration with pianist Guy Van Nueten, was released in November 2003. In February 2004, Barman released The Body Gave You Everything, the debut album by Magnus, his dance-oriented project with techno producer CJ Bolland.

Barman has explored the other side of the camera as well. He agreed to a "leading role" allowing directors, Manu Riche and Renaat Lambeet to film a documentary derived by Barman's everyday life, entitled Tempo of a Restless Soul. After showing at the Ghent Film Festival one reviewer from Flanders Today ranked the film with a split score. He feels the film should receive three of five stars for fans only, and two stars for others. dEUS fans already familiar with Barman, he pointed out, may be interested in the backstage, personal nature of the man due to the everyday "fly on the wall" view of the film. However, he cautioned, it might be confusing to find the semi-retiring rock frontman behind scenes.

Barman is again playing with dEUS. In 2006, Barman was one of the driving forces behind the 0110 concerts.

Barman was involved in polemics in Belgium, when after expressing strong opposition towards male sexual harassment on Belgian national TV, multiple women came forward. A Dutch woman referred to meeting him some 15 years before, where Barman insisted she give him a blowjob in order to access a toilet. Barman apologised for his actions.

References

1972 births
Living people
Belgian film directors
Belgian rock singers
Belgian male guitarists
English-language singers from Belgium
Belgian activists
Columbia Records artists
Belgian people of Norwegian descent
21st-century Belgian male singers
21st-century Belgian singers
21st-century guitarists
Deus (band) members